A Hobbididance, or Hoberdidance, was a malevolent sprite mentioned in the traditional English morris dance. It was the name of one of the fiends in Shakespeare's King Lear:

References
"Hobbididance". Oxford English Dictionary. Oxford University Press. 2nd ed. 1989.

English folklore
Fictional demons and devils
Fictional fairies and sprites